Ve Elizabeth Cadie (1893–August 2, 1956) was an early twentieth century American illustrator of children's books and magazines, a stylist, and a designer.

Career 
She worked as an illustrator for the P. F. Volland Company and Rand McNally & Company, and as a designer for W. S. George Pottery Company, where she was responsible for the "Calico" design. Her images appeared on the cover of magazines like Child Life in the 1930s. In articles about design for the home, she was described as a "prominent designer", "whose originality is causing quite a stir in art and industry".

Cadie obtained a patent for her invention of a heat insulating handle for small home appliances and for a coffee pot design, in 1945 and 1951 respectively.

Selected works 
Merryman, Mildred Plew, and Ve Elizabeth Cadie. Bonbon and Bonbonette. Chicago: Rand McNally & Co., 1924. 
Muter, Gladys Nelson, and Ve Elizabeth Cadie. Two Wooden Soldiers and a Hobby Horse. Joliet, Illinois: P. F. Volland Co, 1924. 
Campbell, Ruth, and Ve Elizabeth Cadie. The Cat Whose Whiskers Slipped: And Other Stories. Joliet, Illinois: P. F. Volland Co, 1925.  Republished by Wise-Parlow Company in 1938. 
Campbell, Ruth, and Ve Elizabeth Cadie. The Turtle Whose Snap Unfastened. Joliet: P.F. Volland, 1927. 
Hankins, Maude McGehee, and Ve Elizabeth Cadie. Daddy Gander. Joliet: P.F. Volland Co., 1928. 
Warde, Margaret, and Ve Elizabeth Cadie. Biddy and Buddy's Holidays. New York: D. Appleton, 1930. 
Cadie, Ve Elizabeth. The ABC Circus. 1932. 
Cadie, Ve Elizabeth, Mister Wubble's Bubbles. 1936. Saafield Publishing Company.

References 

1893 births
1956 deaths
American women illustrators
Women inventors
20th-century American inventors
American designers
American children's book illustrators
20th-century American women artists